The existence of Protestants in Angola dates back to the late 19th century and in some places predates Portuguese colonial missionaries. Many of the nationalist independence leaders were raised as Protestants, including Agostinho Neto (Methodist), Holden Roberto (Baptist) and Jonas Savimbi (Congregational). An estimated 10%-20% of Angolans were Protestant as of the late 1980s.

The government of Angola recognizes 11 Protestant denominations:
 Assembly of God, 
 Baptist Convention of Angola, 
 Baptist Evangelical Church in Angola, 
 Evangelical Congregational Church in Angola, 
 Evangelical Church of Angola, 
 Evangelical Church of South-West Angola, 
 Our Lord Jesus Christ Church in the World (Kimbanguist), 
 Evangelical Reformed Church in Angola, 
 Seventh-day Adventist Church:  306,569 members
 Presbyterian Church of Angola
 Union of Evangelical Churches in Angola
 United Methodist Church

External links
 Christianity in Angola atheism.about.com

References